Target: The Impossible was a Canadian documentary television series seen nationally on CTV from September 1973 to mid-1974 normally on Tuesday nights at 9:30 (Eastern).

The series was produced by Philip Hobel and Douglas Leiterman and focused on scientific achievements. However, Target: The Impossible concluded after one season, failing to repeat the longevity of their previous series Here Come the Seventies.

References

1973 Canadian television series debuts
1974 Canadian television series endings
CTV Television Network original programming
1970s Canadian documentary television series